Vishwas ( Trust / Faith) is a 1969 Hindi-language drama film, produced by J. N. Khatri on the K.P.K. & Vijay Movies banner and directed by Kewal P. Kashyap. It stars Bodybuilder Viswas Agrawal, Aparna Sen, Bharat Bhushan, Kamini Kaushal  and music composed by Kalyanji Anandji.

Plot
Neena's marriage with a wealthy man gets canceled as her poor parents are unable to provide enough dowry. Ramnath Kapoor steps in, marries Neena and she re-locates to live a poor lifestyle with him. Neena is overly ambitious and superficial and starts to live a parallel life where she only values money. Even after the birth of a son, Ravi, she continues to enjoy her life and neglects both her husband and son. Then one day, she steals a necklace and lets Ramnath take the blame, and as a result, he is arrested and imprisoned. When Ramnath returns, there is no trace of Neena, and he undertakes to look after Ravi on his own. Fifteen years later, Ravi has grown up and is a Forest Ranger. His mother Neena, who has taken crime as a career, wants Ravi to live with her, but he turns her down. Ravi crosses paths with Radha, who hails from a rich family in Delhi. Both fall in love with each other, but shock awaits Ravi, who discovers that Radha's aunt is none other than his mother Neena. What happens when Ravi finds out that Radha was merely baiting him to lure and force him to live with his mother Neena?

Cast
Jeetendra as Ravi
Aparna Sen as Radha
Bharat Bhushan as Ramnath 'Ram' Kapoor
Kamini Kaushal as Neena R. Kapoor
Mehmood Jr as Munsaf
Gulshan Bawra as Pyarelal
Rajendra Nath as Nandlal
Asit Sen as Sewak Singh
Manmohan as Mohan
Raj Mehra as Neena's father
Krishan Dhawan as Prem
Shribhagwan as Dhara Singh
Dulari as Ramnath's aunt
Ratnamala as Neena's mother
Padma Rani as Komal
Sadhana Patel as Rani

Soundtrack

References

1960s Hindi-language films
Films scored by Kalyanji Anandji